Liu Boyang (born 18 January 1997) is a Chinese footballer who currently plays as a defender for Kunshan.

Club career
Liu Boyang joined Guizhou Renhe's youth academy in 2011. He started his professional football career in July 2016 when he was promoted to Beijing Renhe's first team squad. On 25 September 2016, he made his senior debut in a 3–3 home draw against Meizhou Hakka, coming on as a substitute for Yi Teng in the 74th minute. He tested positive for the diuretic hydrochlorothiazide after the match and received a ban of one year. Liu returned to field in 2018 after Beijing Renhe won promotion to the first tier. On 10 March 2018, he made his Chinese Super League debut in a 2–1 away win over Tianjin Quanjian. Unfortunately he would go on to be part of the squad that were relegated at the end of the 2019 Chinese Super League. This would be followed by another relegation at the end of the 2020 China League One campaign.  

On 10 April 2021, Liu would transfer on a free to second tier club Kunshan for the start of the 2021 China League One season. He would go on to make his debut in a league game on 25 April 2021 against Beijing BSU in a game that ended in a 2-2 draw. He would go on to establish himself as regular within the team and was part of the squad that won the division and promotion to the top tier at the end of the 2022 China League One campaign.

Career statistics 
.

Honours

Club 
Kunshan
 China League One: 2022

References

External links
 

1997 births
Living people
Chinese footballers
Footballers from Hebei
Sportspeople from Handan
Association football defenders
Beijing Renhe F.C. players
Chinese Super League players
China League One players
Chinese sportspeople in doping cases